Cyril Jones (17 July 1920 – 27 November 1995) was a Welsh professional footballer who played as a defender. He made appearances in the English Football League with Wrexham.

References

1920 births
1995 deaths
Welsh footballers
Association football defenders
Wrexham A.F.C. players
Blaenau Ffestiniog Amateur F.C. players
English Football League players